Vasyl Petrovich Klymentyev (10 October 1943 - disappeared 11 August 2010) was a Ukrainian investigative journalist and the editor-in-chief of the newspaper Noviy Stil based in Kharkiv, Ukraine.

On 11 August 2010, he disappeared under mysterious circumstances and is presumed dead.

Disappearance
Klymentyev was known for his investigations of corruption in the Kharkiv area. He disappeared when he set off from his home in the morning of 11 August 2010.

On 15 August 2010, the police opened an investigation on the presumption that it was first degree murder. On 17 August 2010, Klymentyev's mobile phone  was found floating in the Pechenezskiy Reservoir. Despite several investigations, his fate is still uncertain.

Aftermath
His disappearance has been compared to that of Georgiy Gongadze, an internet journalist murdered in 2000 for investigating corruption. Media watchdogs have seen it as one of many signs of a deterioration in press freedom since the election of President Viktor Yanukovych in February 2010.

See also
 Freedom of the press in Ukraine
 Georgiy Gongadze (journalist who disappeared in 2000)
 List of people who disappeared

References

External links
 Noviy Stil 

1943 births
2010s missing person cases
Assassinated Ukrainian journalists
Missing people
Missing person cases in Ukraine